Hale Center Independent School District is a public school district based in Hale Center, Texas, (US).

In 2009, the school district was rated "recognized" by the Texas Education Agency.

The school's mascot is the Owls. The official mascot is known as "Hootie", and is played by the student who has successfully tried out for the role.

Schools
Hale Center High School (Grades 9-12)
Carr Middle (Grades 5-8)
Akin Elementary (Grades PK-4)

References

External links
Hale Center ISD

School districts in Hale County, Texas